Érudit is a Quebec non-profit publishing platform. Founded in 1998, it publishes research in the humanities and social sciences, as well as select physical and natural science journals. The organization is a consortium of Université de Montréal, Université Laval, and Université du Québec à Montréal. Érudit is the largest provider of Canadian French and bilingual research publications. Over 90% of the content on Érudit is offered in open access; for some journals, the most recent two or three years of issues are restricted, and by subscription only.

References

External links 
 

Web portals
Publishing companies of Canada
Internet properties established in 1998
1998 establishments in Quebec
Academic publishing
Bilingualism
Academic journal online publishing platforms
Open access publishers